Half Moon Island is a minor Antarctic island, lying in McFarlane Strait  north of Burgas Peninsula, Livingston Island in the South Shetland Islands of the Antarctic Peninsula region. The Argentine Cámara Base is located on the island. It is only accessible by sea and by helicopter; there is no airport of any kind. The naval base is operational occasionally during the summer, but is closed during the winter.

Geography 
The island is a series of gravel bars (tombolos) connecting volcanic bedrock islands.  The volcanism is not recent and may be millions of years old. The crescent shaped island may be the result of an eroded caldera similar to the much more recent Deception Island volcano complex.   The parallel gravel bars are a result of post-glacial (isostatic) uplift of the area after the much larger Pleistocene ice cap melted and the pressure was released.

Wildlife
Plants found on the island include several lichen and moss species as well as Antarctic Hairgrass.

The island has been identified as an Important Bird Area (IBA) by BirdLife International because it supports a breeding colony of about 100 pairs of south polar skuas.  Other birds nesting on the island include chinstrap penguins (2000 pairs), Antarctic terns (125 pairs), kelp gulls (40 pairs), Wilson's and black-bellied storm petrels, Cape petrels, brown skuas, snowy sheathbills and imperial shags.

Weddell and Antarctic fur seals regularly haul out on the beaches. Southern elephant seals have been recorded.  Whales are often seen patrolling the shores.

Access
The island is used as a stop during Antarctic cruises, with the peak of visitation during November–March.  There is a  walking track on the southern part of the Island which allows tourists to get a close view of the wildlife (mainly chinstrap penguins and skuas), and of the surrounding mountainous scenery of nearby Livingston and Greenwich Islands. The path begins on the south side of Menguante Cove, runs westwards along the beach to Cámara Base, then turns north along the head of Menguante Cove, and eventually ascends northeastwards to the top of Xenia Hill.

Google Street View
In September 2010, Google added Street View imagery of Half Moon Island to its Google Earth and Google Maps services. The expansion of Google Street View onto the island means all seven continents had imagery through the service. As the island has no roads, the images appear to have been taken with a camera on a tripod. The shadow of the photographer can clearly be seen if one were to move the view so as to look at the ground. Also, the iconic Pegman from Google was replaced with a Penguin, due to the island's use as a breeding colony by them. The penguin has since been changed back to Pegman.

See also

Maps
 Chart of South Shetland including Coronation Island, &c. from the exploration of the sloop Dove in the years 1821 and 1822 by George Powell Commander of the same. Scale ca. 1:200000. London: Laurie, 1822.
 L.L. Ivanov et al., Antarctica: Livingston Island and Greenwich Island, South Shetland Islands (from English Strait to Morton Strait, with illustrations and ice-cover distribution), 1:100000 scale topographic map, Antarctic Place-names Commission of Bulgaria, Sofia, 2005
 L.L. Ivanov. Antarctica: Livingston Island and Greenwich, Robert, Snow and Smith Islands. Scale 1:120000 topographic map.  Troyan: Manfred Wörner Foundation, 2009.  
 Antarctic Digital Database (ADD). Scale 1:250000 topographic map of Antarctica. Scientific Committee on Antarctic Research (SCAR). Since 1993, regularly updated.
 L.L. Ivanov. Antarctica: Livingston Island and Smith Island. Scale 1:100000 topographic map. Manfred Wörner Foundation, 2017.

Gallery

References

External links

 Images from Half Moon Island 
 Videos and photographs of birds of Half Moon Island (including chinstrap penguin, Antarctic shag, pale-faced sheathbill, Wilson's storm petrel and kelp gull)  on the Internet Bird Collection
 

Islands of the South Shetland Islands
South Shetland Islands
Important Bird Areas of Antarctica
Seabird colonies
Tourism sites in Antarctica
Penguin colonies